Judy Shepard-Kegl (born June 20, 1953) is an American linguist and University of Southern Maine professor, best known for her research on the Nicaraguan sign language.

Education 
Kegl received a Bachelor of Arts with a major in anthropology and a Master of Arts in linguistics both in 1975 from Brown University. She received a Doctor of Philosophy in linguistics from the Massachusetts Institute of Technology in 1985.

Her master's thesis was entitled "Some Observations on Bilingualism: A Look at Data from Slovene-English Bilinguals." Her doctoral dissertation was entitled "Locative Relations in American Sign Language Word Formation, Syntax and Discourse."

Career 
Shepard-Kegl is currently a tenured professor of Linguistics and coordinator of the ASL/English Interpreting Program at the University of Southern Maine.

She has worked and written extensively within her field and is best known for her work and multiple academic publishings on the Nicaraguan Sign Language (or ISN, Idioma de Señas de Nicaragua or Idioma de Signos Nicaragüense), a sign language spontaneously developed by deaf children in a number of schools in western Nicaragua in the 1970s and 1980s.

Selected publications 
 Carol Neidle, Judy Kegl, Dawn MacLaughlin, Benjamin Bahan and Robert G. Lee. 1999. The syntax of American Sign Language. The MIT Press. ISBN 

 J Kegl, A Senghas, M Coppola. 1999. Creation through contact: Sign language emergence and sign language change in Nicaragua. In: Language Creation and Language Change, ed. by Michael de Graff. The MIT Press. 

 Gary Morgan, Judy Kegl. 2006. Nicaraguan Sign Language and Theory of Mind: the issue of critical periods and abilities. The Journal of Child Psychology and Psychiatry 47: 811-819. https://doi.org/10.1111/j.1469-7610.2006.01621.x

References

External links
 Comprehensive Kegl background— Official webpage at University of Southern Maine
 Short PBS Documentary on ISN

1953 births
Linguists from the United States
Living people
MIT School of Humanities, Arts, and Social Sciences alumni
University of Southern Maine faculty
Women linguists